Kimchi-buchimgae or kimchi-jeon, is a variety of buchimgae or jeon. It is primarily made with sliced kimchi, flour batter and sometimes other vegetables. However, meat (ground pork) is also often added. Kimchi, spicy pickled vegetables seasoned with chili pepper and jeotgal, is a staple in Korean cuisine. The dish is good for using up ripened kimchi. Kimchibuchimgae is often recognized in Korean culture as a folk dish of low profile that anyone could make easily at home with no extra budget.

It is usually served as some banchan, appetizer or snack.

When preparing kimchi-jeon, brine from kimchi is often added, especially that of baechu-kimchi, made from Napa cabbage. The brine lends its red color to the batter but is not spicy itself. Along with kimchi, it is served as anju with alcoholic beverages such as makgeolli or dongdongju. These days, in addition to the basic ingredients, it is often made with various ingredients such as seafood or cheese.

See also

 Jeon (food)
 Pajeon
 Bindaetteok

References

 Kimchijeon at the National Institute of the Korean Language's dictionary
 Jeon at Doosan Encyclopedia
 Mungbean pancake at Doosan Encyclopedia

External links
Kimchijeon recipe at Canada.com
Kimchi Pancakes Recipe

Korean pancakes
Korean rice dishes
Kimchi dishes